Sebastien Pillay (born 26 January 1978) is a Seychelles politician.  He has served as Leader of the Opposition in the National Assembly since 28 October 2020.

Biography 
Sebastien Pillay was born on 26 January 1978. He received a Bachelor of Education (2004) from Edith Cowan University and a Master of Arts in Educational Leadership & Innovation (2008) from the University of Warwick. Pillay first worked as a mathematics teacher.  After receiving promotions within the Department of Education, he then became a Lecturer at the University of Seychelles.

Pillay was first elected to the National Assembly in 2011 on the United Seychelles (then called "People's Party") list. He was re-elected as a list candidate in 2016 and 2020. He was sworn in as the Leader of the Opposition for the Assembly term beginning 28 October 2020.

Pillay was a member of the Electoral Assessment Mission for the 2015 United Kingdom general election.

References 

Living people
1978 births
United Seychelles Party politicians
Members of the National Assembly (Seychelles)

Edith Cowan University alumni
Alumni of the University of Warwick